Sky Sport is a group of sports satellite TV channels in the German language produced and broadcast by Sky Deutschland.

History

Digitales Sport Fernsehen (Digital Sport Television)
Sky Sport can trace its roots back to the sports channels on the DF1 platform launched in 1996: DSF Plus, DSF Action and DSF Golf. It also has origins in the analogue Premiere channel, launched in 1993, which was also sports-focused.

Premiere Sport
On 1 October 1999, DF1 was turned into Premiere World and sport channels were rebrand on the platforms, to Premiere Sport 1 and 2. When more than two simultaneous events were available, the service could be increased to up to thirteen parallel channels.

On 26 October 2002, a service for Austria, called Premiere Austria, was launched.

Sky Sport
When Premiere became Sky Deutschland on 4 July 2009, the channels were then further rebranded to Premiere Sport 1 and 2 became Sky Sport 1 and 2, while Premiere Austria became Sky Sport Austria and Premiere HD was divided into Sky Sports HD and Sky Cinema HD. 
Sky Sport News HD, a sports news channel, launched on 1 December 2011 in a basic package (Sky Welt).

Channels 
The channels that make up the Sky package broadcast from the Astra 19.2°E satellite position, using the Astra 1H, Astra 1L, and Astra 1M satellites. Channels are uplinked by Sky Italia. Between 2004 and 2016, they were uplinked by SES Platform Services (later MX1, now part of SES Video).

Sky Sport News HD: Germany's only 24-hour LIVE sports news channel. Alongside news bulletins every 15 minutes, it broadcasts highlights, magazines, press conferences and trainings from Bundesliga's teams.
Sky Sport Bundesliga 1: Dedicated channel for live coverage of German Bundesliga and 2. Bundesliga
Sky Sport Bundesliga 2: Dedicated channel for live coverage of German Bundesliga and 2. Bundesliga
Sky Sport Austria: Dedicated channel for live coverage of Austrian Bundesliga and Erste Liga
Sky Sport 1: Live coverage of DFB-Pokal, UEFA Champions League, Tennis.
Sky Sport 2: Live coverage of DFB-Pokal, UEFA Champions League, Tennis, Golf and Boxing.
Sky Sport 3–11: Feed channel, only broadcast special sports events if necessary, or parallel sports events are happening at the same time.
Sky Sport UHD: selected coverage in ultra-high-definition.
Sky Sport Bundesliga UHD: selected coverage in ultra-high-definition.
Sky Sport F1

Programming
Events broadcast on the channels include German Bundesliga and 2. Bundesliga, DFB-Pokal, Austrian Bundesliga, UEFA Champions League, UEFA Europa League, UEFA Europa Conference League (until 2021 (for GER) and 2024 (for AUT)), English Premier league, golf and professional wrestling like AEW.

References

External links
 Sky Sport on sky.de 

Sky Deutschland
Sky television channels
Sports television in Germany
Sports television in Austria
Television channels and stations established in 1993
Television stations in Germany
Television stations in Austria
German-language television stations
Football mass media in Germany